Mercuric amidochloride is an inorganic compound with the formula .

Preparation and properties
It arises from the reaction of mercury(II) chloride and ammonia (Calomel reaction), where the resulting mercuric amidochloride is highly insoluble.

It forms white crystals in the shape of small prisms, which have earthy metallic taste.It consists of a zig-zag 1-dimensional polymer  with chloride counterions.

It is stable in air, but darkens on exposure to light. Sublimes without melting at dull red heat.

This substance is a deadly poison. If improperly handled, may cause dangerous environmental pollution, in soil, water bodies and air. When heated to decomposition, emits very toxic and irritating fumes of hydrogen chloride, nitrogen oxides, and mercury, thus, closed containers with this chemical may explode upon contact with heat. It is very toxic by inhalation, ingestion or contact with skin and its toxicity may be fatal. May cause dermatitis and psoriasis vulgaris. It is corrosive to the mucous membranes. It is not classified as a carcinogen in humans.

Addition of base converts it into "Millon's base" (named after Eugène Millon), which has the formula . A variety of related amido and nitrido materials with chloride, bromide, and hydroxide are known.

Uses
Before the toxicity of mercury was revealed, mercuric amidochloride, then known as "ammoniated mercury", was used as a topical skin antiseptic, especially impetigo, dermatomycosis and other certain dermatoses. It was also used for scaling in psoriasis, to treat pruritus ani, and against pinworm and ringworm infection (especially in dogs), against lesions on the body and near eyes, against crab louse infestation, against bumblefoot infection on poultry, and as a disinfectant. Chronic use of this medication can lead to systemic mercury poisoning. Since less toxic medications are available now, to treat those conditions, there is no need to use mercuric amidochloride as a medication anymore.

See also
 Merbromin, also known as "Mercurochrome", another antiseptic mercury compound
 Thiomersal, another antiseptic mercury compound

References

Mercury(II) compounds
Chlorides
Metal amides